Robert Walter Kerslake, Baron Kerslake,  (born 28 February 1955) is a British retired senior civil servant. He was the Head of the Home Civil Service, after the retirement of the former holder, the Cabinet Secretary, Sir Gus O'Donnell on 31 December 2011 until September 2014.

He continued to be Permanent Secretary at the Department for Communities and Local Government. In December 2014 he was appointed as the Chair of King's College Hospital NHS Foundation Trust to begin in June 2015, and from July 2018 chaired the UK2070 Commission focusing on city and regional inequalities in the UK.

He was introduced as a Crossbench life peer in the House of Lords on 17 March 2015.

Early life
Kerslake was born on 28 February 1955. He is originally from Bath, Somerset, and attended The Blue School, Wells. He graduated with a first class degree in Mathematics from the University of Warwick, where he was also General Secretary of the students' union.

Career
Kerslake qualified as a member of the Chartered Institute of Public Finance and Accountancy and went on to hold a number of posts with councils in London before becoming Chief Executive of the London Borough of Hounslow. He then moved to Sheffield to take up the post of Chief Executive of Sheffield City Council in 1997. From 2008–10 he was Chief Executive of the Homes and Communities Agency; and in September 2010 Kerslake was appointed Permanent Secretary of the Department for Communities and Local Government. In December 2014 he was appointed as the Chair of King's College Hospital NHS Foundation Trust to begin in June 2015.

In October 2016, Kerslake became Chair of the Board of Governors at Sheffield Hallam University. In December 2017, he resigned as Chair of King's College Hospital Trust in protest at what he described as "dire NHS funding problems", and calling for "a fundamental rethink (of)... the way that the NHS is funded and organised". Shortly after, reports surfaced that he had been asked to resign by the chair of NHS Improvement two days previously owing to the trust's "poor financial performance".

Views
Kerslake told Times Radio he believes reappointing Suella Braverman as Home Secretary was a “potential bomb” for the government. Kerslake stated “I think it’s the first mistake by Rishi Sunak. Firstly, because somebody breaches the code in this way, and then seems to escape any real challenge and punishment, it says to others, well, maybe it doesn’t matter, maybe we can ignore it as well?  Secondly, I think she seems to be a serial leaker from all we can establish. And so she has leaked once, there’s every chance she might do it again. And that will be bad news, I think, for Rishi Sunak. My honest advice to him would be to get on and fill his ethics adviser, as it’s often called, as quickly as possible.”

Honours
In 2003, Kerslake was named in a Guardian list of the 100 most influential people in the public sector.
In 2004, he received an honorary doctorate from Sheffield Hallam University for his "distinctive contribution to public service".
In the 2005 New Year Honours, he was knighted "for services to Local Government".
In 2012, he became an honorary graduate (Doctor of Law) of the University of Warwick.
In 2015, he was made a life peer taking the title Baron Kerslake, of Endcliffe in the City of Sheffield.
In 2015, he was elected a Fellow of the Academy of Social Sciences (FAcSS).

References

External links
 Kerslake's blog as Head of Civil Service
 Boom or Bust: The way forward & challenges facing the HCA featuring Sir Bob Kerslake Chief executive of Homes and Communities agency (video)
 Biography of Sir Bob Kerslake at gov.uk

 

 
 
 
|-

Living people
1955 births
Crossbench life peers
People from Bath, Somerset
Alumni of the University of Warwick
British civil servants
Knights Bachelor
Place of birth missing (living people)
Fellows of the Academy of Social Sciences
Life peers created by Elizabeth II